The Pahang Sultanate (Malay: Kesultanan Pahang, Jawi: كسلطانن ڤهڠ ) also referred as the Old Pahang Sultanate, as opposed to the Modern Pahang Sultanate, was a Malay Muslim state established in the eastern Malay peninsula in 15th century. At the height of its influence, the Sultanate was an important power in Southeast Asian history and controlled the entire Pahang basin, bordering to the north, the Pattani Sultanate, and adjoins to that of Johor Sultanate to the south. To the west, it also extends jurisdiction over part of modern-day Selangor and Negeri Sembilan.
 
The sultanate has its origin as a vassal to Melaka, with its first Sultan was a Melakan prince, Muhammad Shah, himself the grandson of Dewa Sura, the last pre-Melakan ruler of Pahang. Over the years, Pahang grew independent from Melakan control and at one point even established itself as a rival state to Melaka until the latter's demise in 1511. During this period, Pahang was heavily involved in attempts to rid the Peninsula of the various foreign imperial powers; Portugal, Holland and Aceh. After a period of Acehnese raids in the early 17th century, Pahang entered into the amalgamation with the successor of Melaka, Johor, when its 14th Sultan, Abdul Jalil Shah III, was also crowned the 7th Sultan of Johor. After a period of union with Johor, it was eventually revived as a modern sovereign Sultanate in the late 19th century by the Bendahara dynasty.

Origin

Melakan conquest of Pahang
Muzaffar Shah, the fifth Sultan of Melaka who reigned from 1445 to 1458 refused to acknowledge the suzerainty of Ligor over his country. The Ligorians, in assertion of their claim, sent an invading army led by Awi Chakri, overland to Melaka. The invaders, who were aided by auxiliaries from Pahang Kingdom, followed the old route by the Tembeling, Pahang and Bera rivers. They were easily defeated and fled back by the same route. Subsequently, they attempted  a naval invasion, but were again beaten. Muzaffar Shah then conceived the idea of checking Ligorian pretensions by attacking the Ligor vassal state, Pahang. An expedition was organised by Muzaffar's son, Raja Abdullah and was personally led by the Melakan Bendahara Tun Perak with two hundred sail, big and small, accordingly proceeded to Pahang and conquered it in the year 1454. The last ruler of the kingdom, Dewa Sura was captured and carried together with his daughter Putri Wanang Seri to Melaka.
 
The Sultan of Melaka appointed Sri Bija Diraja Tun Hamzah, the commander of the army in the conquest, as the governor of Pahang, and permitted him the privillege, once he was out of Melakan waters, of using six of the eight instruments that made up nobat band, and of having a pair of fringed umbrellas borne over him. Sri Bija Diraja accordingly proceeded to Pahang which country he governed for several years. Once a year he visited Melaka to do obeisance to his sovereign. 
 
In the year that Pahang was conquered, Raja Abdullah married Putri Wanang Seri, the daughter of Dewa Sura, whose name had been changed, probably on conversion to Islam, to Putri Lela Wangsa. By her he had two sons Raja Ahmad and Raja Muhammad.

The Sepak Raga incident
Muzaffar Shah died about 1458 and was succeeded by Raja Abdullah who was styled Sultan Mansur Shah. The new ruler, as his sons grew up, paid special favour to Raja Muhammad and designated him as his successor, but when this youth was about fifteen years of age, there happen to be an event which deprived him of all prospects of ruling over Melaka. One day, while riding past a group of boys who were engaged in a sepak raga game, the young prince's headdress was displaced by a misdirected ball kicked by Tun Besar, the Bendahara's son. The infuriated youth, with an angry imprecation, drew his kris and killed the innocent author of the incident.
 
The Bendahara's people flew to arms to avenge Tun Besar's death, but were restrained by the Bendahara who warned them against any measures that might be construed as treason against the Sultan. However, the dead boy's father and his people vowed that the guilty prince should never rule over them. Sultan Mansur, after hearing their complaint, agreed that Raja Muhammad should be exiled from Melaka. He recalled Sri Bija Diraja from Pahang and commanded him to escort Muhammad to that country and install him as Sultan.

History

Founding
Accompanied by Tun Hamzah who was appointed Bendahara for the new kingdom, by Seri Akar Raja as his Hulubalang, by a Penghulu Bendahari, and a Temenggung, and by a hundred youths and a hundred maidens of noble family, Raja Muhammad proceeded to Pahang where he was duly installed Sultan about the year 1470 with the tile Sultan Muhammad Shah. The boundaries of his kingdom extended from Sedili Besar to the south up to border with Terengganu to the north. The first Melakan ruler of Pahang, appears to have settled at Tanjung Langgar in Pekan, the old seat of the former pre-Melakan rulers.
 
The events of this period are obscure. There is reason to believe that Raja Ahmad, the elder brother of the newly appointed Sultan of Pahang, who also had been passed over for the succession to the Melaka throne, as a consolation was installed heir to the Pahang Sultanate by his father in Melaka and proceeded to the country between the years 1470–1475.
 
On 17 September 1475, Sultan Muhammad died and was buried at Langgar on the Pahang Tua. The inscription on his tomb gives his name, descent and the date of his death. According to the commentaries of the younger de Albuquerque, Sultan Mansur of Melaka had, by a daughter of the king of Pahang, a son who was poisoned. It is more likely that this conjecture was in reference to Sultan Muhammad.

Early period
The 17th century Bustan al Salatin records that Muhammad was succeeded by his elder brother Raja Ahmad who took the title Sultan Ahmad Shah. He married a daughter of Tun Hamzah and by her he had a son Raja Mansur. The new ruler was a disgruntled man, he had been passed over for the succession to the Melaka throne twice, first by his younger brother Muhammad, and second by a younger half-brother Raja Hussain, who with the title Sultan Alauddin, succeeded his father Sultan Mansur in 1477. As a result, relations between Pahang and Melaka deteriorated greatly during his reign. 
 
Shortly after his accession, he ordered the killing of Tun Telanai, the hereditary chief of the neighbouring Terengganu, for, without his knowledge, had visited Melaka and paid obeisance to Sultan Alauddin. In 1488, Sultan Alauddin of Melaka died at Pagoh on the Muar river, poisoned, it was said, by the rulers of Pahang and Indragiri. Nobody could have desired Alauddin's death more eagerly than his elder brother Sultan Ahmad of Pahang who had been passed over for the succession to the Melaka throne by Alauddin. The ruler of Inderagiri implicated in the poisoning must have been Raja Merlang who had married Alauddin's half sister Raja Bakal and settled in Melaka where he died.
 
Sultan Alauddin was succeeded by his son Sultan Mahmud with whom his royal uncle of Pahang continued in quarrels. The Malay Annals tell a story of Tun Teja, a daughter of Bendahara of Pahang famed for her beauty who was betrothed to the Pahang Sultan. A Melakan envoy to Pahang, on his return to his country, spread the fame of Tun Teja's beauty. Sultan Mahmud, enamoured of the picture of Tun Teja as presented to him by his chief, promised any reward, however great, to the man who would abduct the Pahang girl and bring her to Melaka. Tun Teja was finally won over by the Melakan Laksamana and was taken to Melaka. The Pahang Sultan, enraged and humiliated, prepared to declare war on Melaka but was later calmed down by his chiefs.
 
The insults put upon the Sultan and his inability to avenge them brought him into disgrace with his people, and made his position untenable. The events took place about 1494. The Malay Annals records that Abdul Jamil was the Pahang ruler concerned, but historians like Linehan and Khoo suggested the happenings occurred during the reign of his uncle, Sultan Ahmad. Sultan Ahmad abdicated in favour of his young son Raja Mansur who assumed the title Sultan Mansur Shah. The new Sultan was placed under the guardianship of his uncles, sons of the first Sultan. In describing Ahmad Shah's life after the abdication, the Malay Annals noted: "his highness went upstream for so long as the royal drums could be heard; when he came to Lubuk Pelang there he resided, and the sound of the drums was no longer heard. He went into religious seclusion; he it is whom people call Marhum Syeikh.
 
Between the years 1488 and 1493, Raja Fatimah, a royal daughter of Alauddin of Melaka and a full sister of Sultan Mahmud, had married a Pahang prince. The Annals state that her husband was Abdul Jamil. She died, childless, on 7 July 1495 and was buried at Pekan Lama in the graveyard which was known as Ziarat Raja Raden. After Ahmad's abdication, it appears that Raja Jamil, the eldest son of the first ruler under the style of Sultan Abdul Jamil, reigned jointly with Ahmad's son, Sultan Mansur. The prince was younger, and Jamil and his brothers seem to have exercised some measure of guardianship over him in the early years of his reign. The period oversaw restoration of ties between Pahang and Melaka.

Middle period
In 1500, the ruler of Nakhon Si Thammarat Kingdom, known in Malay tradition as Ligor, on the instructions of the King of Ayutthaya, with a large army invaded Pahang through Kelantan and the Tembeling. The common danger made the Pahang people forget their squabbles with Melaka. Sultan Mahmud sent a Melakan army, under Bendahara Seri Maharaja to help Pahang. Among the leaders of the expedition were Laksamana Khoja Hassan and the Hulubalang Sang Setia, Sang Naya, Sang Guna, Sang Jaya Pikrama, and Tun Biajid. The forts at Pekan were strengthened, the people mobilized, and the arms got ready. There was delay in completing the main fortification called the 'Fort of Pahang', also known as Kota Biram, which stood on the site of the modern Sultan Abu Bakar Museum, but it was eventually completed before the invasion. The people composed a song, the first line of which ran: "the fort of Pahang, the flames devour". The invaders made only a half-hearted attempt on Pahang, and were soon put to fight with severe losses. They were forced to return by the route which they had come. This was the last Siamese invasion of Pahang.
 
In 1511, the capital of Melaka was attacked and conquered by the Portuguese Empire, prompting a retreat of Sultan Mahmud's court to Pahang by the Penarikan route. There, he was welcomed by Abdul Jamil. The deposed ruler stayed a year in the country during which time he married one of his daughters, whose mother was a Kelantanese princess, to Sultan Mansur. Between 1511 and 1512, while Mahmud was in Pahang, Sultan Abdul Jamil died and was buried at Pekan in the graveyard Ziarat Raja Raden. In the inscription on his tomb, his name given as Abdul Jalil and the date of his death is 917 AH. It is recorded in the de Albuquerque's commentaries, that Sultan Mahmud died of grief in Pahang. The Portuguese must have mistaken Abdul Jamil, who died exactly at the date, for Sultan Mahmud. After Abdul Jamil's death Sultan Mansur was the sole ruler. He was slain by all of his hulubalang between the years 1512 and 1519, for committing adultery with a widow of his father.
 
Mansur was succeeded by his first cousin, Raja Mahmud, another son of Muhammad Shah, who may be the prince who is described as 'the son of the original ruler of Pahang' (anak Raja Pahang raja yang asal) in the Malay Annals. The new Sultan's first royal wife was his first cousin, Raja Olah. After his accession to the throne, he married about the year 1519 a second wife, Raja Khadija, one of the daughters of his cousin Marhum Kampar. This marriage which took place at Bintan was designed to strengthen Marhum Kampar position in his fight against the Portuguese. Mahmud was installed Sultan by his new father in law. 
 
However, Pahang, for an unknown reason, forged an unusual relations with Portuguese during Sultan Mahmud's reign. According to Os Portugueses em Africa, America e Oceania, in the year 1518, Duarte Coelho visited Pahang and stated that the Sultan of Pahang agreed to pay a cup of gold as an annual tribute to Portugal. This act was thought to be a sign friendship shown by the Sultanate, but was regarded by the Portuguese as a sign submission. Manuel de Faria e Sousa relates that until 1522 the Sultan of Pahang had sided with the Portuguese, but seeing that the tide of fortune had turned against them, he, too became their enemy. Ignorant of this change, de Albuquerque sent three ships to Pekan for provisions, where two of his captains and thirty men were killed. The third made his escape but was slain with all his men at Java. Simon Abreu and his crew were also slain on another occasion. Valentyn further records that in 1522 several Portuguese who had landed at Pahang, in ignorance that the Sultan there was son in law to the Sultan of Johor, were murdered, many others were compelled to embrace the Islamic faith, while those who refused to do so were tied to the mouth of cannons and blown to pieces.
 
The Portuguese, who apparently up to that time had made no attack on Pahang, exacted a stern reckoning in 1523. In that year, the Sultan of Johor again invested Melaka with the ruler of Pahang as his ally, and gained a victory over the Portuguese in the Muar River. The Laksamana attacked the shipping in the roads of Melaka, burnt one vessel and captured two others. At this crisis, Martim Afonso de Sousa arrived with succours, relieved the city, and pursued the Laksamana into Muar. Thence he proceeded to Pahang, destroyed all the vessels in the river and slew over six hundreds people in retaliation for the assistance given by their ruler to the Sultan of Johor. Numbers were carried into slavery. A detailed account of Portuguese operations in Pahang during the years 1522-1523 is given by Fernão Lopes de Castanheda. In 1525, Pedro Mascarenhas attacked Sultan of Johor's Bintan, Pahang sent a fleet with two thousand men to help the defenders. The force arrived at the mouth of the river on the very day on which the bridge was destroyed. He despatched a vessel with Francisco Vasconcellos and others to attack the Pahang force which was speedily put to flight. Sultan Mahmud of Pahang appears to have ruled in Pahang all through these events. His namesake of Melaka-Bintan, Marhum Kampar died in 1528, and was succeeded by a son Alauddin Shah II, a youth fifteen years of age. The young ruler visited Pahang about 1529 and married a relative of the Pahang ruler. Sultan Mahmud of Pahang died about 1530, and left two sons Raja Muzaffar and Raja Zainal, the former of whom succeeded him as Sultan Muzaffar Shah.
 
In 1540, Fernão Mendes Pinto gives an account of his voyage with a Portuguese merchant vessel in Pahang. Misfortune overtook them when they were caught in an uproar in Pekan, following the murder of a reigning Sultan. A ruthless mob attacked their resident and seized their goods which amounted fifty thousand ducats  in gold and precious stone alone. The Portuguese managed to escape and proceeded to Pattani. They made representations to the King of Pattani, and he gave instant permission to take reprisals by attacking Pahang boats in the Kelantan River, then a province of Pattani, and to recover goods to the value what had been lost. The Portuguese took the king at his word, fitted out an expedition, and proceeded to the Kelantan River where they attacked and captured three junks owned by Pahang merchants, killing seventy four of the enemy, with a loss of only three of their men. The Sultan, who, according to Pinto, was killed in 1540 appears to have been Sultan Muzaffar. He was succeeded by his younger brother Raja Zainal, who assumed the title Sultan Zainal Abidin Shah.
 
Pahang formed part of the force of three hundred sail and eight thousand men which assembled in the Johor River for a reprisal attack on Pattani, but later negotiations settled the dispute. In 1550, Pahang sent a fleet to help Johor and Perak in the siege of Melaka but the Portuguese warships so harried the harbours of Pahang that the attackers had to retreat to defend their own capital. Sultan Zainal Abidin died about 1555 and was succeeded by his eldest royal son, Mansur Shah II, who about the time of his accession married his first cousin, Purti Fatimah, a daughter of Sultan Alauddin II of Johor (who died at Aceh in 1564). By her, he had a daughter Putri Putih also popularly known as Putri Kecil Besar, and a son, Raja Suboh. There is no further record on the fate of his son, but the daughter would become the ancestress of the future ruling families of Aceh and Perak. Mansur II was killed about 1560 in a war against Javanese Hindus in southern Pahang and was succeeded by his full brother Raja Jamal who took the title Sultan Abdul Jamal Shah. During his reign, Raja Biajid and Raja Kasab, sons of Sultan Khoja Ahmad of Siak, came to Pahang. Raja Kasab married Putri Putih, a daughter of Mansur II. From this union, was descended on the male side, Muzaffar Shah II of Perak, and on the female side,  Iskandar Thani of Aceh. Raja Kasab's children by the Pahang princess were Raja Mahmud, and five daughters of whom the youngest was Putri Bongsu Chandra Dewi. Raja Mahmud was the father of Raja Sulong who ultimately became Muzaffar Shah II of Perak.
 
Abdul Jamal was murdered in 1560 and was succeeded by his half brother Raja Kadir who came to the throne with the title of Sultan Abdul Kadir Alauddin Shah. During his reign, Pahang enjoyed a brief period of cordial relations with the Portuguese. In 1586, Abdul Kadir sent a block of gold bearing quartz as a present to the Portuguese Governor of Malacca. As described by the Portuguese, gold was still commonly mined in quarries across Pahang and sold in great quantity in Melaka. However, this relationship with Portuguese was discontinued by Ahmad II, Abdul Kadir's only son by a royal wife, who was a boy when he died in 1590. According to the Bustan al Salatin, Ahmad II reigned only for a year and was then replaced by his eldest half-brother by a commoner wife, Abdul Ghafur, as he was too young to govern the country. Abdul Ghafur who took the title of Sultan Abdul Ghafur Muhiuddin Shah had married in 1584, Ratu Ungu, a sister of Ratu Hijau, the Queen of Pattani. He also formed marriage connections with kings of Brunei. The Perak Annals relate that he also betrothed his eldest son to a grand daughter of Sultan of Perak. During his reign, Sultan Abdul Ghafur attacked the Portuguese and simultaneously challenged the Dutch presence in the Straits of Malacca. Nevertheless, in 1607, Pahang not only tolerated the Dutch, but even cooperated with them in an attempt to oust the Portuguese.

Late period
In 1607, the Dutch Empire began their trade mission to Pahang lead by the merchant Abraham van den Broeck. On 7 November 1607, a Dutch warship with Admiral Cornelis Matelief de Jonge onboard dropped anchor at Kuala Pahang. Earlier in 1606, Matelief, in an attempt to establish the Dutch power in the Straits of Malacca, was defeated twice by the Portuguese in the First Siege of Malacca and the Battle of Cape Rachado. Matelief, who had come to solicit the assistance of Pahang against the Portuguese, had an audience with the Sultan. The ruler emphasized the importance of alliance between Johor and neighbouring states, and added that he would try to provide two thousand men in order to bring the war to a successful conclusion. At the Sultan's request, Matelief sent him a gunner to test a piece of cannon that was being cast for Raja Bongsu of Johor. The Pahang people also manufactured cannon for firing projectiles which were better than those of Java but inferior to those of the Portuguese.
 
Matelief requested the Sultan to send as soon as possible two vessels to the Straits of Sabon to join the Johor vessels which were already there, and to despatch two more vessels to Penang waters to strengthen the Kedah and Achinese fleets to cut the Portuguese food supplies.
 
Abdul Ghafur tried to reforge the Johor-Pahang alliance to assist the Dutch. However, a quarrel which erupted between him and Alauddin Riayat Shah III, resulted in Johor declaring war on Pahang. In September 1612, the Johor army overran the suburbs of Pekan, which caused great death in the city. With the aid of Sultan of Brunei, Pahang eventually defeated Johor in 1613. Abdul Ghafur's son, Alauddin Riayat Shah succeeded the throne in 1614. However, he was replaced a year later by a relative, Raja Bujang who was installed with the support of the Portuguese following a pact between the Portuguese and the Sultan of Johor. Raja Bujang's appointment was not accepted by Aceh, which was then at war with the Portuguese. Aceh launched savage attacks on Pahang which, in 1617 forced Raja Bujang to flee to Lingga.
 
Pahang nominally entered into a dynastic union with Johor in 1623, when Johor's Abdullah Ma'ayat Shah died and Raja Bujang emerged as the new ruler of Johor-Pahang, installed as Sultan Abdul Jalil Shah Riayat Shah III. From 1629 to 1635, Pahang, operating independently from Sultan Abdul Jalil III appeared determined to oust the Acehnese, allying itself with the Dutch and Portuguese whenever it was expedient to do so. However, in 1637, the appointment of Iskandar Thani to the throne of Aceh, led to the signing of a peace treaty between Pahang and Aceh at Bulang Island in the Riau-Lingga islands. 
 
In 1648, Abdul Jalil III attacked Pahang in an attempt to reassert his position as Ruler of Johor-Pahang. Aceh eventually abandoned its claim over Pahang in 1641 - the same year Portuguese Malacca fell to the Dutch. With the decline of Aceh, Johor-Pahang gradually extended its suzerainty over Riau-Lingga islands, creating the Johor-Riau-Lingga Empire.

Administration
The system of administration adopted by the sultanate is largely modelled on that Melaka. The Malay Annals narrates that during the installation of Muhammad Shah as the first Sultan in 1470, he was accompanied by Tun Hamzah who was appointed Bendahara ('grand vizier') for the new kingdom, by Seri Akar Raja as his Hulubalang ('chief of the army'), by a Penghulu Bendahari ('chief treasurer'), and a Temenggung ('chief of public security'). By the time of Sultan Abdul Ghafur, a sophisticated social hierarchy was established, of which the most important were the offices of four major hereditary chiefs who were granted their respective fiefs to govern on behalf of the Sultan. The system survived until modern times.
 
Pahang was governed by the set of laws that derived from the formal legal text of Melaka consisted of the Undang-Undang Melaka and the Undang-Undang Laut Melaka. The laws as written in the legal digests went through an evolutionary process. The legal rules that eventually evolved were shaped by three main influences, namely the early non-indigenous Hindu/Buddhist tradition, Islam and the indigenous adat. By the early 17th century, during the reign of Sultan Abdul Ghafur, Pahang developed the set of laws into its own version, called Hukum Kanun Pahang, that contain among others, detailed provisions on ceremonial matters, settlement of social conflicts, maritime matters, Islamic laws and general matters.

List of Sultans of Pahang

Economy
Since the pre-Melakan era, the inland river-valley routes that crossed through Pahang formed significant trading network linking east and west coast of the peninsula. The inland attractions were threefold; first the presence of gold in the interior along the Tembeling and Jelai rivers, as well as in Kelantan to the north, second, the presence of tradable forest products, and of local people, the Orang Asli, skilled at getting them, and lastly, the suitability of most of the state for long-distance travel, because of its relatively non-mountainous and open terrain.
 
The Tembeling Valley was the connecting link between ports and tin mining areas of the west coast and the Lebir Valley in southeast Kelantan; the latter led in turn to Patani and Kra Isthmus region. This route involved the short overland stretch known as the Penarikan that allowed boats and their cargo to be dragged the few hundred metres between the headwaters of the Muar, flowing west, and the Serting River, flowing east into Pahang, Jelai and Tembeling systems. The presence of a large group of Pahang merchants in Pattani was recorded in the account of Fernão Mendes Pinto in 1540. 
 
The capital, Pekan, also served as the main trading port to the sultanate, frequented by both international and regional merchants. Despite intermittent diplomatic tensions between Pahang and Portuguese Malacca, the presence of Portuguese merchants in Pekan was mentioned in some accounts. There was also permanent settlement of Chinese miner-merchants in Pekan. The standard currency is tin ingot known locally as tampang, and other native gold and silver coins. Tampang survived in Pahang until 1893. In their original form, tampang were solid slabs of tin, valued at their tin content, and were originally used as medium of exchange in Melaka Sultanate. The Portuguese suppressed all Malay currency when they conquered Melaka in 1511, but this form of coinage persisted in some of the outlying Malay states, particularly Pahang.
 
The most important product of Pahang was gold. Its auriferous mines were considered the best and the largest in the whole peninsula. It was from here that there came the gold which formed the subject of the ancient trade with Alexandria. The peninsula as a whole was known to the world as a source of the precious metal to the extent that it was proclaimed Chrysḗ Chersónēsos (the golden peninsula) by Ptolemy. In 1586, Sultan Abdul Kadir sent a block of gold bearing quartz as a present to the Portuguese Governor of Malacca. As described in the 16th century's Portuguese account, gold was still commonly mined in quarries across Pahang and sold in great quantity in Melaka.

References

Bibliography
 
 
 
 
 

 
History of Pahang
Sultanates in Malaysia
1470 establishments in Asia